Rudolf Schnyder (22 August 1919 – 30 December 2000) was a Swiss sport shooter. He won a silver medal in 50 metre pistol at the 1948 Summer Olympics in London. He also competed at the 1952 Summer Olympics in Helsinki.

References

1919 births
2000 deaths
Swiss male sport shooters
Shooters at the 1948 Summer Olympics
Shooters at the 1952 Summer Olympics
Olympic shooters of Switzerland
Olympic silver medalists for Switzerland
Olympic medalists in shooting
Medalists at the 1948 Summer Olympics